The Sheffield 'Tru Plant' Tigers are a motorcycle speedway team based in Sheffield, England. They currently race in the British SGB Premiership, and their home meetings take place at Owlerton Stadium. The Tigers traditionally hold their race nights on Thursdays between March and October. The Tigers are sponsored by Tru Plant, promoted by Damien Bates, Peter Mole and Julie Reading.

History
Owlerton was a purpose built speedway track built in 1929. The team were inaugural members of the English Dirt Track League and Northern league the following season. In 1930 they rode as the Sheffield Blades. 

It operated for most of the pre-war years and re-opened for a short spell in 1945. The team operated in the Northern League of 1946 and in the National League Division Two between 1947 and 1950. The team won their first trophy in 1947, after winning the British Speedway Cup (Div 2).

It closed part way through 1951 and staged open meetings in 1952. The track re-opened in 1960 and has operated most seasons since then. The team has been known as The Tigers apart from part of 1950 when they were known as The Tars and 1930 when they were the Blades. Sheffield won the Premier League (speedway's second division) twice during the 1999 Premier League speedway season and the 2002 Premier League speedway season. They also won the Knockout Cup in 2002 to complete the double. The club's junior side the Sheffield Prowlers also won silverware winning the Conference League in 2000 and 2001.

The SGB Championship 2017 season was the 21st consecutive season that the Sheffield Tigers competed in division 2. The Tigers finished in 1st place having beaten Ipswich Witches in the two leg Play Off final 99–81.

In 2019, the club won their fourth historical league title winning the SGB Championship 2017 after finishing top of the regular season table and winning the playoffs. Due to the coronavirus (COVID-19) the 2020 season did not take place. The club topped the SGB Premiership 2022 table but lost in the play off final to Belle Vue Aces, which foiled the chance for the club to win their first ever top tier league title. However, they did gain compensation by winning the League Cup.

The Tigers all-time leading point scorer is Sean Wilson with 4246 points and the record appearance maker is Reg Wilson with 470 appearances. Their official track record holder is former captain and No.1 Ricky Ashworth with a time of 59.1 seconds.

Club honours
British Championship League SGB Championship Winners 2017
British Championship Pairs SGB Championship Winners 2017 (Kyle Howarth & Lasse Bjerre), 2018 (Kyle Howarth and Charles Wright)
British Speedway Cup (Division 2) - 1947
British League Knockout Cup winners - 1974
Premier League Four-Team Championship winners - 1999 (Wilson, Smith, Compton, Stead), 2000 (Wilson, Stead, Kessler, Lee)
Premier League Play off winners - 1999, 2002
Premier League winners - 1999, 2002
Conference League Champions - 2000, 2001
Premier Trophy winners - 2001
Premier League Riders Championship winners - Sam Ermolenko (1996), Sean Wilson (1999, 2003, 2005), Andre Compton (2004), Ricky Ashworth (2009), Simon Stead (2014, 2016).
Premier League Pairs winners - Ricky Ashworth & Josh Auty 2010

Notable former riders

Full seasons summary

Season summary (juniors)

Previous seasons

References

Speedway Premier League teams
SGB Championship teams
Tigers